Autochloris collocata is a moth of the subfamily Arctiinae. It was described by Francis Walker in 1864. It is found in the Amazon region.

References

Arctiinae
Moths described in 1864
Moths of South America